In the 2012 season, Djurgårdens IF competes in the Allsvenskan and Svenska Cupen.  Magnus Pehrsson is managing the team for the second year.

Players statistics
Appearances for competitive matches only

|}

Goals

Competitions

Allsvenskan

League table

Matches

Svenska Cupen

References

Djurgarden
Djurgårdens IF Fotboll seasons